Richard DeMartino (born 1939) is an American bridge player. DeMartino is from Riverside, Connecticut, and a graduate of Lehigh University.

Bridge accomplishments

Wins

 North American Bridge Championships (5)
 Leventritt Silver Ribbon Pairs (1) 2011 
 Truscott Senior Swiss Teams (2) 2006, 2007 
 Senior Knockout Teams (1) 2000 
 Keohane North American Swiss Teams (1) 1980

Runners-up

 North American Bridge Championships
 Lebhar IMP Pairs (1) 2002 
 Truscott Senior Swiss Teams (2) 2001, 2008 
 Senior Knockout Teams (2) 2003, 2008

Notes

Living people
American contract bridge players
1939 births
Place of birth missing (living people)
Date of birth missing (living people)
People from Riverside, Connecticut
Lehigh University alumni